DESFA (National Natural Gas System Operator S.A.) is a natural gas transmission system operator in Greece.  It was established on 30 March 2007 as a subsidiary of DEPA.  In addition to the transmission system, the company also operates Greece's gas distribution networks, and the Revithoussa LNG Terminal.

On 11 June 2013, Azerbaijani oil company SOCAR won the tender for acquisition of a 66% stake of DESFA for €400 million. Following Greece's January 2015 legislative election, the offered share was reduced to 49%. The deal, which was expected to be concluded by August 2015, failed in November 2016 as the last offer by SOCAR was rejected. The HRADF issued a new tender on 1 March 2017 with updated conditions of eligibility, officially terminating the previous one.

On 20 December 2018, Senfluga S.A., a consortium formed by Snam (60%), Enagás (20%) and Fluxys (20%), completed the acquisition of a 66% stake in DESFA for an amount of €535 million.

Shareholders

As of January 2019:
 Senfluga S.A. (a consortium formed by Snam (60%), Enagás (20%) and Fluxys (20%)): 66%
 Government of Greece: 33%

As of January 2020:
 Senfluga S.A. (a consortium formed by Snam (54%), Enagás (18%), Fluxys (18%), and DAMCO - a Greek energy company- (10%)): 66%
 Government of Greece: 33%

See also

 Energy in Greece
 List of privatisations in Greece

References

External links 
 

Oil and gas companies of Greece
Natural gas pipeline companies
Companies based in Athens
Chalandri
Greek brands